Xinshe District is a rural district in Taichung, Taiwan. It is also called "Taichung's back garden". The city is home to many military bases. However, the district's hillside houses were destroyed by 1999 Chi-Chi earthquake.

Administrative divisions 
Danan, Yuehu, Zhongzheng, Zhonghe, Zhongxing, Yongyuan, Dongxing, Xiecheng, Kunshan, Xinshe, Fuxing, Fusheng and Qixi Village.

Education

Senior High School 
 Taichung Municipal Xinshe Senior High School

Native products 
Xinshe township fruits:
Citrus, Grape, Carambola, Gaojie Pears, Loquats, Mushrooms, Sugar-apple, flowers, Bonsais

Tourist attractions
 Fuxing Suspension Bridge

Transport 
 Provincial Highway No.21
 County Road 129 (Shigang － Xinshe － Beitun － Taiping, Taichung City)

References

External links 
  

Districts of Taichung